Lennie Bluett (January 21, 1919 – January 1, 2016) was an American film actor, pianist, dancer and singer. His mother was a cook for Humphrey Bogart. At age 16, Bluett started playing the piano at Bogart's parties.

He formed a harmonizing group with his friends called "Four Dreamers". Nat King Cole used to play with the band.

Bluett played a soldier in Gone With the Wind in 1939. His career consisted of minor roles due to the limited opportunities for African-Americans at the time. He relocated to Vancouver in order to avoid being drafted into World War II, and returned afterwards. He died on January 1, 2016, in Los Angeles. He was 96.

Filmography

References

External links
 

1919 births
2016 deaths
American male film actors
20th-century African-American male singers
African-American pianists
American male dancers
American male pianists
20th-century American male actors
21st-century African-American people
American expatriates in Canada